Terry Fitzgerald Moorer (born January 20, 1961) is a United States district judge of the United States District Court for the Southern District of Alabama. He was formerly a United States magistrate judge of the United States District Court for the Middle District of Alabama.

Biography 

Moorer earned his Associate of Arts from the Marion Military Institute, his Bachelor of Arts from Huntingdon College, and his Juris Doctor from the University of Alabama School of Law.

Before assuming his judgeship, Judge Moorer served as an Assistant United States Attorney for the Middle District of Alabama, as a Command Judge Advocate in Camp Arifjan, Kuwait, and as an attorney in the Office of Staff Judge Advocate at Fort Rucker. As a Colonel in the Alabama National Guard, Moorer was the primary architect of the Alabama Code of Military Justice.

Federal judicial service 

Moorer served as a United States magistrate judge of the United States District Court for the Middle District of Alabama, a position he assumed on January 3, 2007, and left on September 4, 2018, when he became a district judge.

On May 8, 2017, President Donald Trump announced his intent to nominate Moorer to an unspecified seat on the United States District Court for the Middle District of Alabama.

On September 7, 2017, President Trump nominated Moorer to serve as a United States district judge of the United States District Court for the Southern District of Alabama, to the seat vacated by Judge William H. Steele, who assumed senior status on June 8, 2017. On November 1, 2017, a hearing on his nomination was held before the Senate Judiciary Committee. On December 7, 2017, his nomination was reported out of committee by voice vote.

On January 3, 2018, his nomination was returned to the President under Rule XXXI, Paragraph 6 of the United States Senate. On January 5, 2018, President Trump announced his intent to renominate Moorer to a federal judgeship. On January 8, 2018, his renomination was sent to the Senate. On January 18, 2018, his nomination was reported out of committee by a 17–4 vote. On August 28, 2018, his nomination was confirmed by voice vote. He received his judicial commission on September 4, 2018.

See also 
 List of African-American federal judges
 List of African-American jurists

References

External links 
 
 

1961 births
20th-century American lawyers
21st-century American lawyers
21st-century American judges
African-American lawyers
African-American judges
Alabama lawyers
Alabama National Guard personnel
Assistant United States Attorneys
Huntingdon College alumni
United States Army Judge Advocate General's Corps
Judges of the United States District Court for the Southern District of Alabama
Living people
Marion Military Institute alumni
National Guard (United States) colonels
People from Greenville, Alabama
Recipients of the Legion of Merit
United States district court judges appointed by Donald Trump
United States magistrate judges
University of Alabama School of Law alumni